The Basco-Béarnaise or Vasca Carranzana is a breed of domestic sheep originating in the Basque country. It was developed from Basque and Béarnaise sheep during the 1960s to be a single-purpose milk breed.

Origins
It derives from a family of sheep breeds from the Pyrénées with falling wool.  It arose in the Béarnaise part of the  Pyrénées. It has long been flocked across the Girondine plain to the Pyrénéan mountain pastures.

Morphology

Its wool is long, white and hanging.  Its horns form a spiral around the ear.  Its head and hooves are coloured reddish-yellow.

Rams are horned and the ewes may be either horned or polled (hornless).  Both sexes display white and are unicolored.

Aptitude
It is a dairy breed, which issued from the AOC Ossau-Iraty, derived from the ewes of the  Pyrénées.  A ewe of this breed produces 120 litres over 130 days of  lactation, producing a milk rich in matière grasse (7,42%) and in proteins (5,39%).

It is a rural breed, which lambs in spring and produces milk in the summer, passing on the richness of the Pyrénéan flora through its milk.

References

Sheep breeds
Sheep's-milk cheeses
Basque domestic animal breeds
Sheep breeds originating in Spain
Sheep breeds originating in France